Ross Bain (born 25 November 1975) is a Scottish professional golfer.

Bain played college golf in the United States at the University of North Carolina at Chapel Hill, before turning professional in 1998. He spent one unsuccessful season on the Challenge Tour before relocating to Asia. He joined the Asian Tour for 1999, and established himself on tour in 2001, finishing runner-up behind Thongchai Jaidee in the Wills Indian Open.

In 2007, Bain played in his first major at the 2007 Open Championship. He made the cut and finished as low Scot at T45.

In 2011, Bain enjoyed his most successful season to date on the Asian Tour, finishing 38th in the Order of Merit. It was the first time he had finished in the top 60, who automatically regain their cards, since 2001.

Professional wins (1)

EPD Tour wins (1)

Results in major championships

Note: Bain only played in The Open Championship.
"T" = tied

References

External links

Scottish male golfers
North Carolina Tar Heels men's golfers
European Tour golfers
Asian Tour golfers
Sportspeople from Dubai
1975 births
Living people
Place of birth missing (living people)